Halls Run is a stream in the U.S. state of Pennsylvania. It is a tributary to Turkey Run.

Halls Run was named after an Irish-American family of pioneer settlers.

References

Rivers of Pennsylvania
Rivers of Venango County, Pennsylvania